Roosevelt Organ Works was an American manufacturer of pipe organs. It was founded by Hilborne Roosevelt (1849–1886) and his younger brother, Frank Roosevelt (1862–1895), in 1872. It operated in New York City, with branches in Baltimore and Philadelphia. The brothers built some of the largest organs in the United States during their career, and many today are still prized for their quality and tone. The company was in operation until 1893.

The Roosevelt brothers were among the first to introduce electricity into organ building.

Partial list of works
Roosevelt organ installations include the following:

Chapel of Immaculate Conception, College of Mount Saint Vincent, Riverdale, Bronx, New York (Opus 4 II/16 - 1873/1880)
Episcopal Cathedral of the Incarnation, Garden City, New York
Trinity Church, New York, New York
Church of the Holy Communion, New York, New York
All Saints Roman Catholic Church, Harlem, New York
Old First Reformed Church, Brooklyn, New York
Christ Church, Glendale, Ohio
Grace Protestant Episcopal Church, New York, New York
First Presbyterian Church (Buffalo, New York)
First Presbyterian Church, New York, New York
Grace & St. Peter's Episcopal Church, Baltimore, Maryland
First Baptist Church in America, Providence, Rhode Island (Opus 150)
First Baptist Church, Nashville, Tennessee, (Opus 291 - 1885)
Elberon Memorial Church, erected 1886 as a memorial to Moses B.Taylor  Long Branch, New Jersey.
 Trinity United Methodist Church, 1820 Broadway, Denver Colorado (1888) (Op. 380)
La Compañía de Jesús Church, Quito, Ecuador (1888) 1104 pipes.
 First Methodist Church, Boulder, Colorado (Opus 382)
Memorial Presbyterian Church, St. Augustine, Florida (1890)
First Presbyterian Church of Wilkes-Barre, Wilkes-Barre, Pennsylvania (1890), No. 409
St, James Roman Catholic Church, Chicago, Illinois (1891)
St. Peter's Episcopal Church, New York (Opus 515 - 1892)
Cathedral of the Immaculate Conception, Syracuse, New York (1892)
St. Dominic Church in Washington, DC (1885)
Crouse College, Syracuse University in Syracuse New York
Christ Church Cathedral, St. Louis, Missouri

References

Manufacturing companies established in 1872
Pipe organ building companies
Manufacturing companies disestablished in 1893
1872 establishments in New York (state)
1893 disestablishments in New York (state)
Musical instrument manufacturing companies based in New York City
American pipe organ builders